Paul Kligman (21 January 1923 – 29 August 1985) was a Canadian actor.

Biography

Born in Romania, he emigrated to Canada where he spent his youth in Winnipeg and studied at the University of Manitoba. He moved to Toronto in 1950 and established his career there. In addition to appearing in CBC Television's 1952 Sunshine Sketches, he was a featured performer with Wayne and Shuster since the comedy duo's early television broadcasts.

He is most famous for his voice acting in various animated television series, especially in the 1960s The Marvel Super Heroes (1966) and Spider-Man (1967), both from Marvel Comics as the first voices of J. Jonah Jameson, General Ross, Red Skull, Krang, Mole Man and Power Man (Erik Josten). He voiced numerous gruff characters, including Donner and Coach Comet, in the 1964 Rankin-Bass adaptation of Rudolph the Red-Nosed Reindeer.

Kligman died aged 62 at Toronto's North York General Hospital following heart failure.

Filmography

References

Bibliography

External links
 

Paul Kligman fonds (R3905) at Library and Archives Canada

1923 births
1985 deaths
Canadian male television actors
Canadian male voice actors
Canadian people of Romanian-Jewish descent
Romanian emigrants to Canada
Jewish Canadian male actors
20th-century Canadian male actors
Canadian sketch comedians
20th-century Canadian comedians
Canadian male comedians